Where White Men Fear to Tread: The Autobiography of Russell Means is the autobiography of Oglala Lakota activist Russell Means. Published in 1996 and written in collaboration with Marvin J. Wolf, the book examines his childhood, his activism for the rights of Native Americans, including his role in the famous standoff with the FBI at Wounded Knee in 1973, and his later forays into politics, film and television.

Reception
The book received mixed reviews. Publishers Weekly called the book a blunt and "absorbing epic" which demonstrates his "resourceful activism", while making no attempt to whitewash the messier aspects of Means' life, such as his drinking, failed marriages, and anger issues.

The Los Angeles Times called it a self-congratulatory "exercise in propaganda and polemic" which grinds an axe against a white-dominated society.

The New York Times wrote, "Mr. Means plays so much at being the warrior king that the commoners among us are turned off and shut out."

References

1996 non-fiction books
American autobiographies
Books by writers from peoples indigenous to the Americas
Books about activists